Philiris vicina is a species of butterfly of the family Lycaenidae. It is found from West Irian to New Guinea.

References

Butterflies described in 1898
Luciini
Butterflies of Indochina
Taxa named by Henley Grose-Smith